The Honor 3C is a mid-end Android smartphone produced by Huawei. It was released in April 2014.
It is the first mid end phone of Huawei's subrand Honor.Honor 3C  has a 5.0-inch liquid crystal display display (so as 3C play) and runs on Android 4.4 KitKat OS after the latest update.

Specifications
The phone has 2 gigabytes of random access memory, 8 gigabytes of internal storage and is connectable using Bluetooth and Wi-Fi.

Software
This phone is shipped with Android 4.2.2, with the EMUI 2.0 lite. It is updated by Huawei to EMUI 3.0(Android 4.4)in July 2015 and further supported by unofficial builds until Android 7.1.

Features
This phone has GPS. It is also the first non-flagship phone that has 720p display and it is the smallest 720p display phone from Huawei.

References
https://www.gsmarena.com/honor_3c-5903.php
https://www.gsmarena.com/honor_3c_play-6603.php

Android (operating system) devices
Mobile phones introduced in 2014
Huawei mobile phones
Discontinued smartphones